Fritz Kreutzpointner (born 14 September 1967) is a German retired racing driver who competed alongside Michael Schumacher and Karl Wendlinger in the 1991 24 Hours of Le Mans with Mercedes.

After rising through the German Formula Ford Championship, he raced for Mercedes in the German Touring Car Championship and World Sportscar Championship between 1990 and 1992 with limited success before retiring from professional motor racing to concentrate on his business career. He returned to motorsport to compete in the FIA European Truck Racing Championship and even won it on two occasions in 1999 and 2001.

Career record

24 Hours of Le Mans results

References

External links

Management Business

1967 births
Living people
German racing drivers
24 Hours of Le Mans drivers
People from Burghausen, Altötting
Sportspeople from Upper Bavaria
Racing drivers from Bavaria
World Sportscar Championship drivers

Mercedes-AMG Motorsport drivers
Deutsche Tourenwagen Masters drivers
Sauber Motorsport drivers